Tout ça... pour ça! (All That... for This?!) is a 1993 French film directed by Claude Lelouch.

Cast and roles
 Marie-Sophie L. - Marie Lenormand
 Francis Huster - Francis Barrucq
 Fabrice Luchini - Fabrice Lenormand
 Alessandra Martines - Allessandra Barrucq
 Vincent Lindon - Lino
 Gérard Darmon - Henri Poncet
 Jacques Gamblin - Jacques Grandin
 Évelyne Bouix - Marilyne Grandin
 Jacques Boudet - The Prosecutor
 Charles Gérard - Policeman
 Antoine Duléry - Antoine
 Céline Caussimon - Esmeralda

Production
The scene in which Fabrice Luchini, Francis Huster, Alessandra Martines and Marie-Sophie L. are in a tent on top of Mont Blanc, was entirely improvised. During it, Luchini incites Martines to perform a fellatio (not seen on camera) to Huster, who seems not really comfortable.

Awards and nominations
César Awards (France)
Won: Best Actor – Supporting Role (Fabrice Luchini)
Montréal Film Festival (Canada)
Won: Best Director (Claude Lelouch; tied with Juanma Bajo Ulloa for La madre muerta)

References

External links

 

French crime comedy films
1993 films
Films directed by Claude Lelouch
Films featuring a Best Supporting Actor César Award-winning performance
1990s French films